Jānis Endzelīns (22 February 1873 – 1 July 1961) was a Latvian linguist.

He graduated from the University of Tartu. In 1908, he and Kārlis Mīlenbahs developed the modern Latvian alphabet, which slowly replaced the old orthography used before.

He was elected a foreign member of the Royal Netherlands Academy of Arts and Sciences in 1936. His son was chess master Lūcijs Endzelīns.

References

1873 births
1961 deaths
People from Valmiera Municipality
People from Kreis Wolmar
Linguists from Latvia
Balticists
University of Tartu alumni
Academic staff of the University of Latvia
Members of the Royal Netherlands Academy of Arts and Sciences
Recipients of the Order of Lenin
Recipients of the Order of the Red Star
Recipients of the Order of the White Lion
Recipients of the Order of the Lithuanian Grand Duke Gediminas
Lenin Prize winners
Linguists from the Russian Empire